The Chickasaw language is a Native American language of the Muskogean family.  It is agglutinative and follows the word order pattern of subject–object–verb (SOV). The language is closely related to, though perhaps not entirely mutually intelligible with, Choctaw. It is spoken by the Chickasaw tribe, now residing in Southeast Oklahoma, centered on Ada.

The language is currently spoken by around 50 people, mostly Chickasaw elders who grew up with the language. Due to boarding schools in the 20th century and Chickasaw removal from their homeland in the 19th century, the widespread knowledge about the language and culture amongst the nation has largely decreased. This being said, there are increasingly more accessible resources for teaching, learning, and preserving this and many other Native American languages, as of the year 2021. There is indeed growing interest in learning, teaching, and preserving this endangered language. The Chickasaw Nation has online resources for teaching this language that are of great utility.

Classification
Chickasaw, Choctaw and Houma form the Western branch of the Muskogean language family. The Chickasaw and Choctaw were once one tribe who similarly spoke the Muskogean languages. The Chickasaw language was widely spoken until 1970 but has since become an endangered language. Chickasaw is also related to Alabama, Koasati, Mvskoke (Creek)-Seminole, Hitchiti and Mikasuki.

History
Sometime prior to the first European contact, the Chickasaw migrated from western regions and moved east of the Mississippi River, where they settled mostly in present-day northeast Mississippi. Chickasaw towns and villages were structured to be densely populated as a wartime measure but encompassed larger areas when there was no conflict with enemies. A main house and main meeting ground were used to gather groups from the Chickasaw community for ceremonies, celebratory affairs, and to discuss important social, cultural, and political matters. There was a division and specialization in labor done by men who prepared the community for war, hunted for food, and made provisions for the defense of their communities while Chickasaw women tended the home, handled farming and agriculture, and raised the families. They would eventually come into contact with Europeans as time passed on and European exploration of their lands took shape. That is where they encountered European explorers and traders, having relationships with French, English and Spanish during the colonial years. The United States considered the Chickasaw one of the Five Civilized Tribes, as they adopted numerous practices of European Americans. Resisting European-American settlers encroaching on their territory, they were forced by the US to sell their country in 1832 and move to Indian Territory (Oklahoma) during the era of Indian Removal in the 1830s.

Current status

Emily Johnson Dickerson, the last monolingual speaker of Chickasaw, died on December 30, 2013. Ethnologue estimated in its seventeenth edition that Chickasaw retained up to 600 speakers, but noted that this figure was rapidly declining because most speakers are 50 and older. Children are no longer acquiring the language, indicating Chickasaw has a notably low vitality. As of 2014, there were "four to five confident conversational speakers who are under the age of 35." The Chickasaw language is not much used outside of the home. In terms of conservation and language vitality, Ethnologue evaluates the current language situation as moribund,  and UNESCO lists Chickasaw as a "severely endangered" language, also noting that most of the ~50 speakers (as of 2019) are over fifty and almost all are bilingual in English.

Language revitalization 
The Chickasaw Language Revitalization Program, founded in 2007, uses both Munro-Willmond and Humes alphabets. Because Chickasaw is a spoken language, "there is no 'right' or 'wrong' way to spell Chickasaw." Chickasaw is taught through a master-apprentice program, community programs, and self-study programs.

A "Chickasaw Language Basic" app is available for iPhone, iPad, and other iOS devices.

Classes and programs
The Chickasaw Nation has a department of Chickasaw Language with a 24-member Chickasaw Language Committee. In 2007, the tribe founded the Chickasaw Language Revitalization Program. Four levels of Chickasaw language classes are taught at East Central University in Ada, Oklahoma. Joshua D. Hinson (called "Lokosh," meaning gourd, in the language), director of the Chickasaw Language Committee developed master-apprenticeship programs with guidance from linguist Leanne Hinton.

Chipota Chikashshanompoli is a children's language program that meets monthly. Ada, Ardmore, Norman, Purcell, Sulphur, and Tishomingo all host non-academic adult language classes. The tribe also organizes immersion camps and publishes Chickasaw language literature through the Chickasaw Press.
More recently, the Chickasaw Language Revitalization Program has been working with Rosetta Stone and Ackerman McQueen, releasing a video series teaching learners how to speak Chickasaw with the Rosetta Stone Advanced Languages software.

Phonology

Consonants
Chickasaw has 16 consonants. In the table below, the consonants are written in the standard Chickasaw orthography. The phonetic symbolization of each consonant is written in the International Phonetic Alphabet (IPA) to the right of each orthographic letter when the orthography differs from the IPA symbol.

  is labiovelar.
 Voiceless stops  have a small amount of aspiration , especially at the beginning of words.
 The voiced stop  may undergo lenition to a voiced fricative  between vowels.
 All consonants except for the glottal stop may be geminated and most consonants can occur in biconsonantal clusters.

Vowels

Chickasaw has 9 vowels:

Chickasaw vowels contrast between short and long oral vowels and between long oral vowels and long nasal vowels. Short vowels are centralized (see chart): short i is phonetically , short o is phonetically , and short a is phonetically .

Short vowels are also phonetically lengthened when they occur in the second syllable of a sequence of even-numbered open syllables. For example, the word pisali ('I took him') is phonetically . The lengthened short vowel is usually intermediate in length between a short vowel and long vowel. However, the phonetic realization varies depending on the individual speaker and also on phonetic environment. The lengthening does not occur at the end of words and is further restricted by certain morphological criteria.

Alphabet

Prosody

 pitch accent

Grammar

Verb

Pronominal affixes

Verb arguments (i.e. subject, direct object, indirect object) are indicated with pronominal affixes (both prefixes and suffixes) which are added to verb stems. The pronominal affixes are inflected according to number (singular, plural) and person (1st, 2nd).

Chickasaw has an active–stative pronominal system with two basic series of pronominal sets: an active series (I) and a stative series (II). Additionally, Chickasaw also has dative (III), negative (N), and reciprocal (IR) series.

The active series is used for active intransitive subjects and active transitive subjects. (An active subject, simply put, is a subject that is in control of the action while a stative subject does not have control of the action. This is the difference between She fell on purpose vs. She fell accidentally where the first she controlled the falling while the second she did not control the falling.) The active series is in the table below:

The third person lacks an affix and usually does not distinguish between singular and plural. The first person singular affix is a suffix while the other affixes are prefixes. The first person plural has two forms: il- which is used before vowels and ii- which is used before consonants — thus, il-iyya "we go", ii-malli "we jump". An example inflectional paradigm of the verb malli "to jump" is below (with the pronominal affixes underlined):

The stative series (II) is below. This series is used to indicate stative intransitive subjects and direct objects.

Example with stative intransitive subjects, lhinko "to be fat":

Example with direct objects, pisa "to look at (someone)" (the subject in the paradigm below is unmarked because it is in the third person):

Both active and stative affixes can occur together in which case the active affix indicates the active subject and the stative affix indicates the direct object. Active prefixes occur before stative prefixes. When ish- "active second person singular" occurs before sa- "stative first person singular", it results in issa- (the sh assimilates to s). Likewise, hash- "active second person plural" + sa- is realized as hassa-. The full paradigm of pisa "to look at" is below:

Verb grades

 verb grades (gemination, epenthesis)

General vocabulary 
{| class="wikitable"
!English
!Chickasaw
|-
|Hello (general greeting)
|Chokma/Hallito
|-
|How are you? 
|In order to define a question, one must use a question word (such as nanta, katiyakta, katimpi, etc.) or an affix (such as -taa, shown below, or -tam). A question can also be implied, as shown in the first and last examples

Chinchokma? 
Chinchokmataa?
Chokma (a word meaning "good", saying chokma as a greeting can also imply a question of how one is doing)
|-
|I'm well.
I'm very well.

I'm alright.

I'm not well.
|The prefix "An-" implies that the speaker is referring to themselves. The suffix  "-kinni" and the word  "ooba" refers to the level of "wellness" that they find themselves in.

 Anchokma.
 Anchokmakayni.
 Anchokma ooba.
 Anchokma ki'yo.
|-
|And you? (In response)
|Ishnaako?
|-
|Yes
No

Okay
|The word "Ho'mi" can also mean okay, yes, affirmative, good, etc.

 Ii
 Ki'yo
 Ho'mi
|-
|I will see you later.
|Speakers may very on what they say for this phrase, as there is no word for goodbye, but it largely revolves around these three. The nasal "o" is voiced by many speakers, but many speakers also tend to leave it out. The suffix "-shki" adds a degree of confidence regarding seeing someone later. It may be translated as "I shall see you later," "I will see you later," or even "I have to see you later." "Chipisala'cho", however, means something like "I'll see you later (not knowing when)."

 Chipisala'cho.
 Chipisala'cho.
 Chipisala'shki.
|-
|I like ___.
He/she likes ___.

You like ___.

We like ___.

They like ___.

Y'all like ___.

Do you like ___?
|In this block, we will use hattak shawi' imimpa (bananas: literally, "the raccoon man's food") as an example for what the person/group likes. As for the last instance, "ch" sounds turn into "sh" sounds when suffixes beginning with a 't' are attached to the end of a word. 
Hattak shawi' imimpa' ayokpanshli.
Hattak shawi' imimpa' ayokpanchi.
Hattak shawi' imimpa' ishayokpanchi.
Hattak shawi' imimpa' illayokpanchi.
Hattak shawi' imimpa' hooayokpanchi.
Hattak shawi' imimpa' hashayokpanchi.
Hattak shawi' imimpa' ishayokpáshtaa?
|-
|Deer
Panther

Wildcat

Raccoon

Bird

Alligator

Bear

Fox

Turtle

Skunk

Wolf

Fish

Squirrel

Blackbird

Buzzard

Hawk

Eagle

Duck

Goose

Swan

Turkey
|All these animals are, or were, significant to Chickasaw culture and religion.

 Issi'''
 Kowishto
 Kowimilhlha' or kowi' imilhlha Shawi Foshi Hachonchaba Nita Chola
 Loksi Koni'''
 Nashoba Nani
 Fani
 Chalhlha Shiiki Akankabi
 Osi
 Fochosh Shalaklak or hancha
 Ookak Chaloklowa
|-
|Yellow
Red

Pink

Green/Blue

Brown

Orange

Purple

Gray

Black

White
|As with most adjectival verbs in Chickasaw, colors will end in a glottal stop (') when attached to a noun (ex. foshi' homma''')

 Lakna HommaHommayyi Okchamali Losayyi Takolo lakna Homma chommi Shobbokoli Losa Tohbi|}

Notes

Bibliography
 Gordon, Matthew. (2004). "A phonological and phonetic study of word-level stress in Chickasaw". International Journal of American Linguistics, 70 (1), 1-32.
 
 
 
 Munro, Pamela; Willmond, Catherine (1994). Chickasaw: An analytical dictionary''. Norman: University of Oklahoma Press.
 Munro, Pamela; Willmond, Catherine (2008) Let's Speak Chickasaw = Chikashshanompa' Kilanompoli'. Norman: University of Oklahoma Press.
 "The Chickasaw People." www.utm.edu. 2017.

External links

 Chickasaw Language Revitalization Program, Chickasaw Nation
 Chickasaw Language - Information & Videos - Chickasaw.TV
 Universal Declaration of Human Rights in Chickasaw
 A phonological and phonetic study of word-level stress in Chickasaw (pdf)
 The phonology of pitch accents in Chickasaw (pdf)
 OLAC resources in and about the Chickasaw language
 A History of the Chickasaw People (website)
 http://www.omniglot.com/writing/chickasaw.htm

Agglutinative languages
Chickasaw
Muskogean languages
Subject–object–verb languages
Indigenous languages of Oklahoma
Indigenous languages of the North American Southeast
Native American language revitalization
Endangered indigenous languages of the Americas